Frauenwohl ("Women's Welfare") was a German women's society composed of philanthropic women who took as their work the devising of schemes for bettering the conditions of less fortunate women. It was founded by Minna Cauer in Berlin in 1888, who also served as the editor of the association's official organ, also called Frauenwohl.

History
Cauer founded the first Frauenwohl organisation in Berlin in 1888 with the aim of encouraging the establishment of associations of the same name in Danzig, Königsberg, Frankfurt (Oder), Breslau, Bonn, Bromberg, Rudolstadt and finally, also in Hamburg. It was focused on advancing the basic demands for equal rights for women in all areas.

The association was established in Hamburg at the end of 1895 and, like four other associations, was based in the women's center founded by Lida Heymann at Paulstraße 9 in Hamburg. Heymann and especially Cauer came to the fore as founders.

Although the scope of the association overlapped with that of the local group of the German Association of Female Citizens, there were major differences in the way it worked and in the political approach. In the Frauenwohl association, there were never cautious "ifs" and "buts"; it was never asked whether something would cause offense to the authorities or in the high society and families of Hamburg. The progressive feminists of Frauenwohl association protested with undisguised objectivity against everything that seemed unfair to it, made criticisms at public meetings and in the press; it made its demands and made no compromises.

Their activities included: holding meetings and discussions on current political issues; courses on civics, constitution, guardianship, political parties; and prisoners were visited and following their sentences they were socially supported. The association's demands included: a uniform association law for all of Germany; employment of female doctors in schools; a total transformation of the prison system; thorough reform of the girls' school system; and expansion of women's employment, especially new types of jobs of a scientific and commercial nature. 

Cauer was also the editor of the association's weekly pamphlet, also called Frauenwohl.

Notable people
 Minna Cauer (1841-1922), pedagogue, feminist activist, pacifist and journalist
 Hedwig Dohm (1831-1919), feminist and author
 Helene von Forster (1859-1923), women's rights activist and author
 Lida Heymann (1868-1943), feminist, pacifist and women's rights activist
 Bertha Kipfmüller (1861-1948), school teacher, women's rights activist, pacifist 
 Jeanette Schwerin (1852-1899), women's rights activist and social work pioneer

See also
 Feminism in Germany

References

Bibliography
 Cauer, Minna: 25 Jahre Verein Frauenwohl Groß-Berlin, Loewenthal [Druck], Berlin 1913, online (in German)
 Twellmann, Margit (ed.): Erlebtes, Erschautes: Deutsche Frauen kämpfen für Freiheit, Recht und Frieden; 1850–1940. Lida Gustava Heymann und Anita Augspurg, 1941. Helmer Verlag, Frankfurt a. M. 1992, ISBN 3-927164-43-7 (in German)

1888 establishments in Germany
Organizations established in 1888
Women's organisations based in Germany
Liberal feminist organizations
Women's rights organizations
Feminism in Germany